Cardiff City Council was the local government district authority that administered the city of Cardiff, capital of Wales, from 1974 until 1996. The district council replaced the pre-1974 county borough council. It was succeeded in 1996 by Cardiff Council.

History
Local government in England and Wales was reorganised following the Local Government Act 1972. The old administrative county of Glamorgan was subdivided, with Cardiff and the Vale between Cardiff and Bridgend forming South Glamorgan. South Glamorgan County Council came into existence on 1 April 1974. The administration of the area was further subdivided between the two district councils, Cardiff City Council (later Cardiff Council) and the Vale of Glamorgan Borough Council (later the Vale of Glamorgan Council).

Cardiff City Council ceased to exist following the 1996 local government reorganisation, replaced by the unitary authority of the Cardiff Council. In effect, the old city council took over the county level functions of the abolished South Glamorgan County Council.

Political control
Prior to 1974, Cardiff had traditionally been a Conservative Party stronghold, but the city council's first administration in 1974 had a Labour Party majority, reflecting the changing social composition of the city. Control of the council changed regularly during its existence, between Labour, Conservative and a period from 1987 to 1991, when no party had a majority. The first election to the reconstituted council was held in 1973, initially operating as a shadow authority alongside the outgoing authorities until it came into its powers on 1 April 1974. Political control of the council from 1974 until its abolition in 1996 was held by the following parties:

Leadership
The leaders of the council included:

Labour's Philip Dunleavy was the first leader of the council from 1974 to 1976, then again from 1979 to 1982 (when Labour regained its majority). He became Lord Mayor of Cardiff in 1982-3. Dunleavy was a driving force behind the creation of St David's Hall, the Cardiff Ice Rink and other initiatives.

Councillor Ron Watkiss was Conservative leader of the council during their majority administration, which ended in May 1987.

Llanrumney councillor John Reynolds became leader of the minority Labour administration in 1987 (he had been leader of the Labour group since 1983). He died in 1990.

Councillor John Phillips subsequently became leader of the Labour group. Described as a Labour 'traditionalist', in 1994 he was ousted by Sue Essex of the 'new urban left', who had been promoting a green agenda in Cardiff through the 1990s.

The last leader of the city council, Sue Essex, narrowly lost to Russell Goodway (the last leader of South Glamorgan County Council) in the election to be leader of the Labour group and hence the new council.

Elections
At the first Cardiff City Council elections in 1973, 75 city councillors were elected from 21 electoral wards. From 1983, the number of wards increased to 26. From 1987, the number of councillors reduced to 65.

Party with most elected councillors in bold.

Premises
The council was headquartered at City Hall in Cathays Park, which had been built in 1905 for the former Cardiff County Borough Council.

Bibliography
Alan Hooper; John Punter (Eds.) Capital Cardiff 1975–2020: Regeneration, Competitiveness and the Urban Environment. University of Wales Press (2006), .

References

1974 establishments in Wales
1996 disestablishments in Wales
20th century in Cardiff
District councils of Wales
Politics of Cardiff
South Glamorgan